Georges Zvunka (5 March 1937 – 12 April 2022) was a French football player and manager.

He was the brother of Jules Zvunka and Victor Zvunka.

References

 FC Metz profile

1937 births
2022 deaths
Sportspeople from Moselle (department)
French footballers
French people of Romanian descent
Association football defenders
FC Metz players
Ligue 1 players
French football managers
Footballers from Grand Est